Thierry Pata (born 12 February 1965) is a retired French breaststroke swimmer. He competed in two events at the 1984 Summer Olympics.

References

External links
 

1965 births
Living people
French male breaststroke swimmers
Olympic swimmers of France
Swimmers at the 1984 Summer Olympics
Place of birth missing (living people)